The C&C 1/2 Ton is a Canadian sailboat, that was designed by C&C Design as an International Offshore Rule Half Ton class racer.

The C&C 1/2 Ton design was the basis for the C&C 29 of 1977.

Production
The boat was built by C&C Yachts in Canada as a made-to-order, semi-custom built limited edition boat between 1975 and 1980, with only 12 examples completed, but it is now out of production.

Design
The C&C 1/2 Ton is a small racing keelboat, built predominantly of fiberglass, with wood trim. It has a masthead sloop rig, an internally-mounted spade-type rudder and a fixed fin keel. It displaces .

The boat has a PHRF racing average handicap of 165 with a high of 165 and low of 168.

Operational history
The boat is support by an active class club, the Half-Ton Class.

The first boat delivered was named SuperStar and sailed by Hans Fogh to 7th place in the 1/2 Ton Cup races held at Trieste, Italy in 1976.

See also
List of sailing boat types

Related development
C&C 29

Similar sailboats
Annie 30
Cal 9.2 
Catalina 309
C&C 30
C&C 30 Redwing
CS 30
Grampian 30
Hunter 30
Hunter 30T
Hunter 30-2
Hunter 306
Mirage 30
Nonsuch 30
Santana 30/30

References

Keelboats
1970s sailboat type designs
Sailing yachts
Sailboat type designs by C&C Design
Sailboat types built by C&C Yachts